Baku, Azerbaijan has a variety of parks located in various parts of the capital and in the suburbs of the Absheron Peninsula. The following is an incomplete list.

References

External links
12 Legendary parks of Baku - AzerTAc

Parks in Baku
Baku
Parks